The 1967 Kansas City Athletics season involved the team's finishing tenth in the American League with a record of 62 wins and 99 losses, 29½ games behind the American League Champion Boston Red Sox. This was the franchise's 13th and final season in Kansas City. After the season, the team relocated from Kansas City to Oakland. This precipitated a series of events culminating in the enfranchisement of the Kansas City Royals in the 1969 Major League Baseball expansion.

The paid attendance for the season was 726,639 fans.

Offseason
 November 29, 1966: Manny Jiménez was drafted from the Athletics by the Pittsburgh Pirates in the 1966 minor league draft.
 January 28, 1967: 1967 Major League Baseball Draft (January Draft) notable picks:
Round 1: Ken Hottman  (did not sign)
Secondary Phase
Round 5: Jim Panther .
 In the offseason, local millionaire Ewing Kauffman was approached by a group led by sportswriter Ernie Mehl to buy the club and ensure that it remained in Kansas City.

Regular season
Despite an 18–18 start, the Athletics had a record of 35 wins compared to 49 losses by the All-Star Break.
On June 9, Reggie Jackson debuted in the major leagues with the A's at home in a doubleheader shutout sweep of  the Cleveland Indians. He started in right field and went hitless in three at-bats in the opener, then entered the nightcap in the fifth inning and promptly hit a lead-off triple off of long reliever Orlando Peña, but did not score.

Season standings

Record vs. opponents

Notable transactions
 June 6, 1967: 1967 Major League Baseball Draft (June Draft) notable picks:
Round 2: Vida Blue
Round 11: Eric Soderholm (did not sign)
Secondary Phase:
Round 4: Warren Bogle
Round 5: Ray Peters (did not sign)
Round 7: Darrell Evans

Roster

Player stats

Batting

Starters by position
Note: Pos = Position; G = Games played; AB = At bats; H = Hits; Avg. = Batting average; HR = Home runs; RBI = Runs batted in

Other batters
Note: G = Games played; AB = At bats; H = Hits; Avg. = Batting average; HR = Home runs; RBI = Runs batted in

Pitching

Starting pitchers
Note: G = Games pitched; IP = Innings pitched; W = Wins; L = Losses; ERA = Earned run average; SO = Strikeouts

Other pitchers
Note: G = Games pitched; IP = Innings pitched; W = Wins; L = Losses; ERA = Earned run average; SO = Strikeouts

Relief pitchers
Note: G = Games pitched; W = Wins; L = Losses; SV = Saves; ERA = Earned run average; SO = Strikeouts

Farm system

LEAGUE CHAMPIONS: Birmingham, GCL A's

Awards and honors
Bert Campaneris led the American League in stolen bases for the third consecutive season.

Relocation
May 7, 1967: The New York Times and New York Daily News reported that the Athletics were prepared to relocate to Oakland, California.
July 1967: The Sporting News reported that the Athletics had reached an agreement to relocate to Milwaukee, Wisconsin. The Athletics had obtained pledges for television and radio broadcasting rights with the sponsorship of Schlitz Brewery. The proposed move would require the support of seven of the ten American League owners. The league only had five votes in favour of the proposed relocation.
August 1, 1967: The Governor of Washington State Dan Evans, and mayor of Seattle, J.D. Braman spoke to Finley on the phone to discuss the relocation of the team to Seattle. Finley had met with city officials on August 7 to discuss a possible relocation.
In September 1967, Finley had sent a telegram to city manager Carleton Sharpe, advising that the Athletics would leave Kansas City for Oakland.
October 18, 1967: City officials from Kansas City, Oakland and Seattle were invited by Joe Cronin to discuss the A's relocation plans. United States Senator Stuart Symington attended the meeting and discussed the possibility of revoking baseball's antitrust exemption if the A's were allowed to leave Kansas City. The owners began deliberation and after the first ballot, only six owners were in favour of relocation. The owner of Baltimore voted against, while the ownership for Cleveland, New York and Washington had abstained. In the second ballot, the New York Yankees voted in favour of the Athletics' relocation to Oakland. To appease all interested parties, the Athletics announced that MLB would expand to Kansas City and Seattle no later than the 1971 MLB season.

References

External links
1967 Kansas City Athletics team page at Baseball Reference
1967 Kansas City Athletics team page at www.baseball-almanac.com

Oakland Athletics seasons
Kansas City Athletics season
1967 in sports in Missouri